Ilya Aleksandrovich Stefanovich (born 23 June 1996) is a Russian football player. He plays as forward for FC Torpedo Moscow.

Club career
He made his debut in the Russian Professional Football League for FC Znamya Truda Orekhovo-Zuyevo on 30 April 2015 in a game against FC Strogino Moscow.

He made his debut for the main squad of FC Kuban Krasnodar on 23 September 2015 in a Russian Cup game against FC Shinnik Yaroslavl.

On 3 February 2023, Stefanovich signed with Russian Premier League club FC Torpedo Moscow. He made his RPL debut for Torpedo on 5 March 2023 against FC Krasnodar and scored a goal in a 2–2 away draw.

References

External links
 
 
 

1996 births
Footballers from Dnipro
Ukrainian emigrants to Russia
Living people
Russian footballers
Association football forwards
FC Znamya Truda Orekhovo-Zuyevo players
FC Kuban Krasnodar players
FC Chernomorets Novorossiysk players
FC KAMAZ Naberezhnye Chelny players
FC Veles Moscow players
FC Irtysh Omsk players
FC Volgar Astrakhan players
FC Torpedo Moscow players
Russian First League players
Russian Second League players
Russian Premier League players